Maharaja Sir Kishan Singh, KCSI (1899–1929) was the ruling Maharaja of the princely state of Bharatpur (1918–1929) and successor of Maharani Girraj Kaur. During Partition, the princely states of Alwar and Bharatpur were the sites of a pogrom directed against the Muslim Meo community. The Meos are a distinctive Rajput Muslim community with a number of Hindu or Rajput practices. They also had a history of being assertive, and bearing arms.

Both Jai Singh of Alwar and Kishan Singh of Bharatpur (1899–1929) provided official patronage to the Arya Samaj and its Shuddhi movement of conversion to Hinduism. The Hindu Mahasabha and the Rashtriya Swayamsevak Sangh (RSS) grew in importance with the patronage of their durbars. The Mahasabha's V. D. Savarkar set in motion a policy of courting Hindu princes. He officially changed the official script from Nastaliq to Nagari, and banned the teaching of Urdu and Persian in state schools. The Shahi Jama Masjid in Alwar was one of several important buildings that were converted by order of the government. Discriminatory taxation led to a tax revolt by the Muslim Meo population, in the course of which the state army opened fire on a crowd with machine guns at Govindgarh on January 7-8, 1933, and killed more than 30 people. Nevertheless, Ian Copland, examining census records, shows how the Muslim population which had been 26.2% of Alwar in 1941 and 19.2% of Bharatpur, dropped after the pogroms, conversions and flight, to 6% in both states. About two-thirds of their land was taken away.

Early life
Maharaja Kishan Singh was born at Moti Mahal, Bharatpur on 4 October 1899 in a Jat family. He was eldest son of Maharaja Ram Singh by his second wife, Maharani Girraj Kaur. He was educated at Mayo College, Ajmer and Wellington.

His father was deposed in 1900, and his mother served as regent for her son until he assumed full powers in November 1918.

He was brought by his mother to attend the Delhi Durbars of 1903 and 1911.

References

External links
Genealogy of the ruling chiefs of Bharatpur

Jat rulers
Jat
Rulers of Bharatpur state
Knights Commander of the Order of the Star of India
Grand Officers of the Order of the Crown (Belgium)
1899 births
1929 deaths